"Loded" is a song by American rock band Hurt. The song was released as the second and final single from the band's album Vol. II. The song failed to reach the same success as previous single "Ten Ton Brick," only peaking at no. 33 on the Mainstream Rock Songs chart. "Loded" is the last single by the band to be released through Capitol Records.

Background
"Loded" originally appeared on the band's second studio album The Consumation, which was released in 2003. The song was re-recorded in 2007 for the album Vol. II. The song was released as a single following a poll on the band's forum.

Track listing

Chart positions

Personnel
 J. Loren Wince – vocals, guitar
 Paul Spatola – guitar
 Josh Ansley – bass
 Evan Johns – drums

References

Hurt (band) songs
2007 songs
2008 singles
Capitol Records singles